Dorothy Marie "Dottie" Metcalf-Lindenburger (born May 2, 1975, in Colorado Springs, Colorado) is a retired American astronaut. In 2000, she married Jason Metcalf-Lindenburger, a fellow Whitman College graduate and educator, from Pendleton, Oregon, and they now have one daughter together. She was a science teacher at Hudson's Bay High School in Vancouver, Washington when she was selected in 2004 as an educator mission specialist. Her parents are  Joyce and Keith Metcalf, who reside in Fort Collins, Colorado. She was the first Space Camp alumna to become an astronaut.

Education
 Fort Collins High School, Fort Collins, Colorado.
 Bachelor of Arts, Geology with honors and cum laude, Whitman College, Walla Walla, Washington, 1997.
 Teaching Certification, Central Washington University, Ellensburg, Washington, 1999.
 MS in Geology, University of Washington, Seattle, Washington, 2016

Organization
 International Order of the Rainbow for Girls
 Phi Beta Kappa
 National Education Association
 The Mars Generation

Honors
 2007 Space Camp Hall of Fame Inaugural Inductee
 1999 Outstanding Teacher Preparation Candidate at Central Washington University.
 1997 Whitman College Leed's Geology Award
 1997 Whitman College Order of the Waiilatpu
 1996 GSA Field Camp Award
 1995–1996 NAIA Academic All-American in Cross Country and Track
 1996 NAIA Conference Champion in the 10K.

Teaching career
 Five years of teaching earth science and astronomy at Hudson's Bay High School in Vancouver, Washington.
 Three years of coaching cross-country at the high school level, and two years of coaching Science Olympiad.
 Undergraduate research with the KECK Consortium for two summers:
 1995 in Wyoming mapping the last glaciations of Russell Creek, and
 1996 mapping and determining the petrology of the rocks in the Wet Mountain region of Colorado.Both research positions led to publications.

NASA career
Metcalf-Lindenburger was selected by NASA in May 2004 as an astronaut candidate. Astronaut candidate training includes orientation briefings and tours, numerous scientific and technical briefings, intensive instruction in Shuttle and International Space Station systems, physiological training, T-38 flight training, and water and wilderness survival training. Successful completion of this training in February 2006 qualified her as a NASA Astronaut.  She served as a mission specialist on STS-131, an April 2010 Space Shuttle mission to the International Space Station. The mission's primary payload was the Multi-Purpose Logistics Module.

On July 20, 2009, Metcalf-Lindenburger sang the National Anthem at the Houston Astros game against the St. Louis Cardinals in celebration of the 40th anniversary of the Apollo 11 Moon landing. She has been a long-time lead singer with the all-astronaut rock band, "Max Q".

On April 16, 2012, NASA announced that Metcalf-Lindenburger would command the NEEMO 16 undersea exploration mission aboard the Aquarius underwater laboratory, scheduled to begin on June 11, 2012, and last twelve days.  The NEEMO 16 crew successfully "splashed down" at 11:05 am on June 11.  On the morning of June 12, Metcalf-Lindenburger and her crewmates officially became aquanauts, having spent over 24 hours underwater.  The crew safely returned to the surface on June 22.

Metcalf-Lindenburger retired from NASA on June 13, 2014, to live and work in the Seattle area.

Spaceflights
STS-131 Discovery (April 5 to 20, 2010), a resupply mission to the International Space Station, was launched at night from the Kennedy Space Center, Florida.  On arrival at the station, Discoverys crew dropped off more than 27,000 pounds of hardware, supplies and equipment, including a tank full of ammonia coolant that required three spacewalks to hook up, new crew sleeping quarters and three experiment racks.  On the return journey, Leonardo, the Multi-Purpose Logistics Module (MPLM) inside Discoverys payload bay, was packed with more than 6,000 pounds of hardware, science results and trash.   The STS-131 mission was accomplished in 15 days, 2 hours, 47 minutes and 10 seconds and traveled 6,232,235 statute miles in 238 Earth orbits.

References

External links
 
 Spacefacts biography of Dorothy Metcalf-Lindenburger
 The Mars Generation TEDx Talk

1975 births
Living people
Aquanauts
Women astronauts
Educator astronauts
Schoolteachers from Washington (state)
American women educators
NASA civilian astronauts
People from Colorado Springs, Colorado
Science teachers
Whitman College alumni
People from Vancouver, Washington
Space Shuttle program astronauts
21st-century American women